The Three and The Two is an album by drummer Shelly Manne, featuring multi-instrumentalist Jimmy Giuffre, pianist Russ Freeman, and trumpeter Shorty Rogers. It was recorded at two sessions in 1954, originally released on two 10-inch LPs, and re-released in 1960 on a 12-inch LP on the Contemporary label.

Background
The first session (The Three) features Manne on drums, Rogers on trumpet, and Giuffre on clarinet, tenor and baritone sax. The second session (The Two) features Manne on drums and Russ Freeman on piano.

The musicians had long experience playing alongside each other, and when the album was recorded were performing together in the West Coast group Shorty Rogers and His Giants. During live appearances, they often performed free improvisations, or unusual renditions of popular songs, as a trio or as a duo.

The sessions forming this record follow the same experimental approach, combining some original compositions and some re-interpretations of jazz standards, exploring different musical forms (including some reminding of European classical music), pursuing interplay and counterpoint, and researching new sound textures, as was often the case in Manne's work.

Reception

The AllMusic review by Scott Yanow states: "Although these selections were not influential, they rank second in chronological order (behind Lennie Tristano's performances of 1949) among free jazz records. [...] Overall, a very interesting reissue".

Track listing
The Three
 "Flip" (Shelly Manne) - 2:56
 "Autumn in New York" (Vernon Duke) - 4:30
 "Pas De Trois" (Jimmy Giuffre) - 4:35
 "Three On A Row" (Shorty Rogers) - 5:08
 "Steeplechase" (Charlie Parker) - 3:16
 "Abstract N°1" (Jimmy Giuffre / Shelly Manne / Shorty Rogers) - 3:34
The Two
 "The Sound Effects Manne" (Russ Freeman) - 4:00
 "Everything Happens To Me" (Tom Adair / Matt Dennis) - 4:15
 "Billie's Bounce" (Charlie Parker) - 4:07
 "With A Song In My Heart" (Lorenz Hart / Richard Rodgers) - 3:46
 "A Slight Minority" (Russ Freeman) - 3:22
 "Speak Easy" (Russ Freeman) - 4:20

Recorded at Contemporary's studio in Los Angeles on September 10, 1954 (tracks 1–6), and September 14, 1954 (tracks 7-12).

Personnel
Shelly Manne - drums
Jimmy Giuffre (tracks 1–6) - clarinet, tenor saxophone, baritone saxophone
Shorty Rogers (tracks 1–6) - trumpet
Russ Freeman (tracks 7-12) - piano

References

External links
 Shelly Manne: "The Three" & "The Two" - An in-depth review by David A. Orthmann

Contemporary Records albums
Shelly Manne albums
1954 albums